Adriana Sofía Ugarte Pardal (born 17 January 1985) is a Spanish actress. She is known for her leading roles on television series La Señora and El tiempo entre costuras. Ugarte landed a starring role in the 2016 Pedro Almodóvar film Julieta.

Biography 
Adriana Sofía Ugarte Pardal was born in Madrid on 17 January 1985, the daughter of Yolanda Pardal, lawyer and writer. She is the grandniece of Eduardo Ugarte, who was a collaborator of Luis Buñuel and who was married to a daughter of Carlos Arniches. She studied at the Colegio del Pilar in Madrid. She enrolled into a licentiate degree of Philosophy and Arts at the Complutense University of Madrid, which she temporarily shelved, and later resumed at the National University of Distance Education (UNED).

Ugarte, age 16, debuted in the short film Mala Espina (2001), directed by Belén Macías, and won the Award to the Best Female Performance at the Alcalá de Henares Festival of Short Films for her role performing a schizophrenic teenage girl. She was given guest roles in TV series such as Policías, en el corazón de la calle, Hospital Central and El comisario. She was nominated to the Goya Award for Best New Actress for her role as Consuelo in the 2006 film Doghead directed by Santi Amodeo.

Ugarte's leading performance as Victoria Márquez de la Vega in the television series La Señora (aired from 2008 to 2010) earned her great popularity. This same year, she made an appearance in The Hanged Man, with Clara Lago and Álvaro Cervantes. She then starred in Paper Castles (2009) along with Nilo Mur and Biel Durán, and in Lo contrario al amor (2010), alongside Hugo Silva. She also featured in the miniseries Stolen Children (Telecinco), in which she plays Susana.

In 2013, two years after shooting was finalized, El tiempo entre costuras premiered, the series based on the novel of the same name by writer María Dueñas. Starring Ugarte as Sira, it achieved breaking viewing figures in Antena 3 by the closure of the series.

Filmography

Television 
Heridas    2022

Film 
{| class="wikitable sortable"
! Year
! Title
! Role
! class = "unsortable" | Notes
! class = "unsortable" | 
|-
| align = "center" | 2006
|Cabeza de perro (Doghead)
|Consuelo || || align = "center" |
|-
| rowspan="2" align = "center" | 2007
|
|Eva || || align = "center" |
|-
|El patio de mi cárcel (My Prison Yard)
|Alejandra || || align = "center" |
|-
| rowspan = "2" align = "center" | 2009
|El juego del ahorcado (The Hanged Man)
|Olga || || align = "center" |
|-
|Castillos de cartón (Paper Castles)
|María José || || align = "center" |
|-
| rowspan="2" align = "center" | 2011
|Lo mejor de Eva (Dark Impulse)
|Marta || || align = "center" |
|-
|
|Merce || || align = "center" |
|-
| rowspan="2" align = "center" | 2013
|Combustion
|Ari || || align = "center" |
|-
|Gente en sitios (People in Places)
| || || align = "center" |
|-
| rowspan="2" align = "center" | 2015
|
|Vero || || align = "center" |
|-
|Palmeras en la nieve (Palm Trees in the Snow)
|Clarence || || align = "center" |
|-
| align = "center" | 2016
|Julieta
|Julieta || || align = "center" |
|-
| rowspan="2" align = "center" | 2017
|El sistema solar
|Inés || || align = "center" |
|-
|Tadeo Jones 2: El secreto del rey Midas
|Tiffany || Voice || align = "center" |
|-
| rowspan="2" align = "center" | 2018
| (The Other Woman)
|Emma || || align = "center" |
|-
|Durante la tormenta (Mirage)
|Vera Roy || || align = "center" |
|-
| align = "center" | 2023 || Lobo feroz || Matilde || || align = "center" | 
|}

 Short films 
 Cuánto. Más allá del dinero (2017)–as Lucía
 Estocolmo (2008)–as Sol
 Diminutos del calvario (2002)–as Doncella
 Mala espina (2001)–as Sara

 Theater 
 The big theatre of the world (2013)
 The house of Bernarda Alba'' (2006)

Awards and nominations 
Goya Awards

Fotogramas de Plata

Premios Ondas

Premios de la Unión de Actores y Actrices

Iris Awards (the annual prizes of the Academy of the Sciences and the Arts of Television of Spain)

References

External links 

1985 births
Living people
Actresses from Madrid
Spanish television actresses
Spanish film actresses
21st-century Spanish actresses